Campionato Primavera may refer to:
 Campionato Nazionale Primavera, a defunct youth competition of Italian football
 Campionato Primavera 1, current top level of Italian football in under-19 age group
 Campionato Primavera 2, the second-highest level of Italian football in under-19 age group